Phenol formaldehyde resins (PF) or phenolic resins (also infrequently called phenoplasts) are synthetic polymers obtained by the reaction of phenol or substituted phenol with formaldehyde. Used as the basis for Bakelite, PFs were the first commercial synthetic resins (plastics). They have been widely used for the production of molded products including billiard balls, laboratory countertops, and as coatings and adhesives. They were at one time the primary material used for the production of circuit boards but have been largely replaced with epoxy resins and fiberglass cloth, as with fire-resistant FR-4 circuit board materials.

There are two main production methods. One reacts phenol and formaldehyde directly to produce a thermosetting network polymer, while the other restricts the formaldehyde to produce a prepolymer known as novolac which can be moulded and then cured with the addition of more formaldehyde and heat. There are many variations in both production and input materials that are used to produce a wide variety of resins for special purposes.

Formation and structure
Phenol-formaldehyde resins, as a group, are formed by a step-growth polymerization reaction that can be either acid- or base-catalysed. Since formaldehyde exists predominantly in solution as a dynamic equilibrium of methylene glycol oligomers, the concentration of the reactive form of formaldehyde depends on temperature and pH.

Phenol reacts with formaldehyde at the ortho and para sites (sites 2, 4 and 6) allowing up to 3 units of formaldehyde to attach to the ring. The initial reaction in all cases involves the formation of a hydroxymethyl phenol:

 HOC6H5  +  CH2O   →   HOC6H4CH2OH
The hydroxymethyl group is capable of reacting with either another free ortho or para site, or with another hydroxymethyl group. The first reaction gives a methylene bridge, and the second forms an ether bridge:

 HOC6H4CH2OH  +  HOC6H5   →   (HOC6H4)2CH2  +  H2O
 2 HOC6H4CH2OH   →   (HOC6H4CH2)2O  +  H2O
The diphenol (HOC6H4)2CH2 (sometimes called a "dimer") is called bisphenol F, which is an important monomer in the production of epoxy resins. Bisphenol-F can further link generating tri- and tetra-and higher phenol oligomers.

Novolaks

Novolaks (or novolacs) are phenol-formaldehyde resins with a formaldehyde to phenol molar ratio of less than one. In place of phenol itself, they are often produced from cresols (methylphenols). The polymerization is brought to completion using acid-catalysis such as sulfuric acid, oxalic acid, hydrochloric acid and rarely, sulfonic acids. The phenolic units are mainly linked by methylene and/or ether groups. The molecular weights are in the low thousands, corresponding to about 10–20 phenol units. Obtained polymer is thermoplastic and require a curing agent or hardener to form a thermoset.

Hexamethylenetetramine is a hardener added to crosslink novolac. At a temperature greater than 90 °C, it forms methylene and dimethylene amino bridges. Resoles can also be used as a curing agent (hardener) for novolac resins. In either case, the curing agent is a source of formaldehyde which provides bridges between novolac chains, eventually completely crosslinking the system. 

Novolacs have multiple uses as tire tackifier, high temperature resin, binder for carbon bonded refractories, carbon brakes, photoresists and as a curing agent for epoxy resins.

Resoles

Base-catalysed phenol-formaldehyde resins are made with a formaldehyde to phenol ratio of greater than one (usually around 1.5). These resins are called resoles. Phenol, formaldehyde, water and catalyst are mixed in the desired amount, depending on the resin to be formed, and are then heated. The first part of the reaction, at around 70 °C, forms a thick reddish-brown tacky material, which is rich in hydroxymethyl and benzylic ether groups.

The rate of the base-catalysed reaction initially increases with pH, and reaches a maximum at about pH = 10. The reactive species is the phenoxide anion (C6H5O−) formed by deprotonation of phenol. The negative charge is delocalised over the aromatic ring, activating sites 2, 4 and 6, which then react with the formaldehyde.

Being thermosets, hydroxymethyl phenols will crosslink on heating to around 120 °C to form methylene and methyl ether bridges through the elimination of water molecules. At this point the resin is a 3-dimensional network, which is typical of polymerised phenolic resins. The high crosslinking gives this type of phenolic resin its hardness, good thermal stability, and chemical imperviousness. Resoles are referred to as "one step" resins as they cure without a cross linker unlike novolacs, a "two step" resin.

Resoles are major polymeric resin materials widely used for gluing and bonding building materials. Exterior plywood, oriented strand boards (OSB), engineered high-pressure laminate are typical applications.

Crosslinking and the formaldehyde/phenol ratio
When the molar ratio of formaldehyde:phenol reaches one, in theory every phenol is linked together via methylene bridges, generating one single molecule, and the system is entirely crosslinked. This is why novolacs (F:P <1) do not harden without the addition of a crosslinking agents, and why resoles with the formula F:P >1 will.

Applications
Phenolic resins are found in myriad industrial products. Phenolic laminates are made by impregnating one or more layers of a base material such as paper, fiberglass, or cotton with phenolic resin and laminating the resin-saturated base material under heat and pressure. The resin fully polymerizes (cures) during this process forming the thermoset polymer matrix. The base material choice depends on the intended application of the finished product. Paper phenolics are used in manufacturing electrical components such as punch-through boards, in household laminates, and in paper composite panels. Glass phenolics are particularly well suited for use in the high speed bearing market. Phenolic micro-balloons are used for density control. The binding agent in normal (organic) brake pads, brake shoes, and clutch discs are phenolic resin. Synthetic resin bonded paper, made from phenolic resin and paper, is used to make countertops. Another use of phenolic resins is the making of duroplast, famously used in Trabant automobiles.

Phenolic resin is used as a binder in loudspeaker driver suspension components which are made of cloth.

Higher end billiard balls are made from phenolic resins, as opposed to the polyesters used in less expensive sets.

Sometimes people select fibre reinforced phenolic resin parts because their coefficient of thermal expansion closely matches that of the aluminium used for other parts of a system, as in early computer systems
and Duramold.

The Dutch painting forger Han van Meegeren mixed phenol formaldehyde with his oil paints before baking the finished canvas, in order to fake the drying out of the paint over the centuries.

Trade names 

 Bakelite was originally made from phenolic resin and wood flour.
 Ebonol is a paper-filled phenolic resin designed as a replacement for ebony wood in stringed and woodwind instruments.
 Novotext is cotton fibre-reinforced phenolic, using randomly oriented fibres. 
 Oasis Floral Foam is "an open-celled phenolic foam that readily absorbs water and is used as a base for flower arrangements."
 Paxolin is a resin bonded paper product long used as a base material for  printed circuit boards, although it is being replaced by fiberglass composites in many applications.
Tufnol is a laminated plastic available as sheet and rods, which is made from layers of paper or cloth which have been soaked with phenolic resin and pressed under heat. Its high resistance to oils and solvents have made it suitable for many engineering applications.
 Richlite is a paper-filled phenolic resin with many uses, from tabletops and cutting-boards to guitar fingerboards.

Biodegradation

Phenol-formaldehyde is degraded by the white rot fungus Phanerochaete chrysosporium.

See also
 Urea-formaldehyde
 Para tertiary butylphenol formaldehyde resin

References

 
Synthetic resins
Semiconductor device fabrication
Thermosetting plastics